Christian Joseph Rasmussen  (1845–1908) was a Danish composer.

See also
List of Danish composers

References
This article was initially translated from the Danish Wikipedia.

Danish composers
Male composers
1845 births
1908 deaths
19th-century male musicians